The Aurora programme (sometimes called Aurora Exploration Programme, or simply Exploration Programme) was a human spaceflight programme of the European Space Agency (ESA) established in 2001. The objective was to formulate and then to implement a European long-term plan for exploration of the Solar System using robotic spacecraft and human spaceflight to investigate bodies holding promise for traces of life beyond the Earth.

Overview
Member states commit to participation in the Aurora programme for five-year periods, after which they can change their level of participation or pull out entirely. In the early years the Aurora programme planned for flagship missions and arrow missions for key technology demonstrations, such as Earth re-entry vehicle/capsule and Mars aerocapture demonstrator. Although human spaceflight has remained a long-term goal of the programme, with some basic technology development in this area, the thrust has been on implementation of the ExoMars mission and preparations for an international Mars sample return mission.

Europe strategy for space had three main points including:"explore the solar system and the Universe", "stimulate new technology", and "inspire the young people of Europe to take a greater interest in science and technology". One of the foundational principles of the Aurora program is recognising the interdependence of technology and exploration;.

Missions

The first decade is planned to focus on robotic missions.

Flagship missions

ESA describes some Aurora programme missions as "Flagship" missions. The first Flagship mission is ExoMars, a dual robotic mission to Mars made in cooperation with the Russian Federal Space Agency (Roskosmos). It will involve development of a Mars orbiter (ExoMars Trace Gas Orbiter), a technology demonstrator descent module (Schiaparelli lander) and the Rosalind Franklin rover.

Flagship missions considered for the Aurora programme include:
 ExoMars, consisting of an uncrewed Mars orbiter and lander launched jointly with the Russian Federal Space Agency in 2016 on Proton rocket with Fregat upper stage.
 Rosalind Franklin rover launch to be conducted jointly the Russian Federal Space Agency in the mid- or late-2020s
 a robotic Mars Sample Return Mission by the mid-2020s 
 a human space mission to be launched in the mid-2030s

Arrow missions

Arrow missions are technology demonstrator missions focused on developing a certain technology needed for the Flagship missions. Approved Arrow missions so far (as of 30 January 2003):
Earth re-entry vehicle/capsule, a step in the preparations for the Mars Sample Return mission.
Mars aerocapture demonstrator, to further develop the technologies for using a planet's atmosphere to brake into orbit. This particular mission seems to have been revised into an expanded mission to demonstrate "aerobraking/aerocapture, solar electric propulsion and soft landing" to be launched in 2020.

Timeline

The proposed Aurora roadmap (as of 30 September 2005. This roadmap can, and most likely will, go through revisions):
 2014 – Human mission technologies demonstrator(s) to validate technologies for orbital assembly and docking, life support and human habitation
 2016 and 2020 – ExoMars rover to Mars. The scientific objectives include exobiological studies as well as study of the surface of Mars.
 2026 – Robotic mission to Mars
 2030s – First human mission to Mars, as a split mission. The proposed Ariane M rocket may be used for this landing.

The human part of the programme has been challenged by the main ESA contributors (France, Germany and Italy), making it quite possible that the whole Aurora Programme will be refocused on robotic-only exploration of Mars.

See also
 Astrobiology
 Constellation program
 Space exploration
 Human spaceflight
 Mars sample return mission

References

External links
Aurora site at ESA
Aurora Industry Day 2006
Brochure of the Aurora Programme
Another publication about Aurora
Aurora Roadmap poster

Astrobiology
European Space Agency programmes
Human missions to Mars
Human spaceflight programs
Proposed spacecraft
Space policy of the European Union
2001 establishments in Europe